The Barren Grounds Nature Reserve is a protected nature park located in the Southern Highlands region of New South Wales, Australia. The  reserve is situated east of Budderoo National Park, and west of the city of Kiama. The reserve can also be accessed from the south, via a local road and a bush walk from the town of Berry. It is not far from the Nameless Sylvan Reserve owned by Bush Heritage Australia.

The nature reserve has several good lookouts that offer views of the coast. Interesting rock formations can be seen at Drawing Room Rocks, a geological feature in the southern part of the reserve. The former Barren Grounds Bird Observatory is located in the park.

Birds
The reserve is part of the  Budderoo and Barren Grounds Important Bird Area which contains large numbers of endangered eastern bristlebirds, as well as smaller numbers of pilotbirds and rockwarblers, in a mosaic of sandstone heath and eucalypt woodland habitats.

See also

 Flying Fox Pass
 Protected areas of New South Wales

References

External links

DECCW - Barren Grounds Nature Reserve
Yallaroo - Barren Grounds Nature Reserve

Nature reserves in New South Wales
Important Bird Areas of New South Wales
Protected areas established in 1956
1956 establishments in Australia
Southern Highlands (New South Wales)